Jacqueline 'Jackie' Dyson (born 1943), is a female former swimmer who competed for England.

Swimming career
She represented England and won a silver medal in the 220 yards breaststroke at the 1958 British Empire and Commonwealth Games in Cardiff, Wales.

She was a 15 year-old pupil of Bonner Hill School when selected for the Games and swam for Kingston Ladies.

References

1943 births
English female swimmers
Swimmers at the 1958 British Empire and Commonwealth Games
Commonwealth Games medallists in swimming
Commonwealth Games silver medallists for England
Living people
20th-century English women
21st-century English women
Medallists at the 1958 British Empire and Commonwealth Games